"Lean wit It, Rock wit It" is a song by Atlanta rap group Dem Franchize Boyz from their album On Top of Our Game. The recording features Peanut and Charlay and was produced by Classic Buck$ aka Buck and Maurice "Parlae" Gleaton.

The song peaked at number 7 on the Billboard Hot 100 and number 1 on the Hot Rap Tracks chart. Classic Buck$ aka Buck and Maurice "Parlae" Gleaton produced the recording. The music video shows them snap dancing. The song is considered to be the turning point in Dem Franchize Boyz career as it brought them into mainstream hip hop and also wide spread the subgenre of snap music. Lyrics from the bridge of the song were sampled in the Twenty One Pilots song "Holding on to You", “Do it to it, as well as in the Juice WRLD song "Lean wit Me".

"Coming Undone wit It" (Mash-up Official Remix)
Korn and Dem Franchize Boyz did a mashup of their respective hit singles at the time, "Coming Undone" and "Lean wit It, Rock wit It", titled "Coming Undone wit It". The mashup was produced by Jermaine Dupri and Scott Spock from the Matrix, and was first released on AOL in April 2006. The mashup has new parts by both groups exclusively for the song. A video for "Coming Undone wit It" was released on the DVD portion of Korn's Chopped, Screwed, Live and Unglued. This is the official remix to "Coming Undone" and "Lean wit It, Rock wit It".

Charts

Weekly charts

Year-end charts

References

2005 songs
2006 singles
Dem Franchize Boyz songs
Snap songs
Southern hip hop songs
Novelty and fad dances
Hip hop dance